Hangmen is the plural of hangman; an executioner who carries out a death sentence by hanging.

Hangmen, or The Hangmen, may also refer to:

Hangmen (DC Comics), a DC Comics supervillain team
Hangmen (film), a 1987 American film
Hangmen (play), a play by Martin McDonagh
The Hangmen (British band)
The Hangmen (Washington, D.C. band)
Hangmen Motorcycle Club

See also

 
 
 Hangman (disambiguation)